Lophodermium caricinum is a species of fungus in the family Rhytismataceae. It is a decomposer known to live on dead tissues of Carex capillaris, Carex machlowiana, Eriophorum angustifolium and Kobresia myosuroides.

References 

Fungi described in 1861
Leotiomycetes